Sudarshan (Sudi) Devanesen, CM, is a family medicine physician and educator, public health activist, and member of the Order of Canada. An order of which he was initiated into for his role in preventing Heart disease affecting South Asians in Canada.

Devanesen was founding president (1994–1997) of a South Asian Community Council of the Heart and Stroke Foundation of Ontario, and has both studied and educated on the risks of cardiovascular disease in the South Asian community in Canada.

Early life and education 
Devanesen is of Sri Lankan-Indian descent, born in Sri Lanka to a Sinhalese mother, and Tamil father. Devanesen's father, Chandran Devanesen, was the first Indian Principal of Madras Christian College while his mother, Savithri (Norma Amybelle) was a sister of Leslie Goonewardene, who founded Sri-Lanka's first political party, the Lanka Sama Samaja Party, and played an instrumental role in both the Indian independence movement and the Sri Lankan independence movement.

Devanesen studied at Bishop Cotton Boys' School in Bangalore, Madras Christian College of the University of Madras, and the Christian Medical College in Vellore, all in India.

Career 
Devanesen began his medical practice in remote villages in Tamil Nadu and Rajasthan.

In 1972, he immigrated to Canada. After briefly training at Janeway Children's Hospital at Memorial University of Newfoundland in St. John's, Newfoundland, he moved to Toronto He joined the Post Graduate programme in Family Medicine at St Michael's Hospital.. He began study at St. Michael's Hospital and the Faculty of Medicine of the University of Toronto in 1973; he would eventually become chief of family and community medicine at St. Michael's Hospital from 1988 to 1998 and is today an Associate professor at the University of Toronto. He was medical director of the Broadview Community Health Clinic from 1980 to 1989. He also served as physician for the Fred Victor Centre, a downtown Toronto mission serving the homeless, and on the board of directors of Casey House, a hospice serving HIV/AIDS patients.

He earned his Master of Clinical Science degree from the University of Western Ontario in 1990, and is a Fellow of the College of Family Physicians of Canada.

Medical beliefs 
An advocate of holistic medicine, Devanesen's practice integrates the medical and biopsychosocial models of health care. Particularly concerned with prevention of disease and interested in cardiovascular disease, he became founding president (1994–1997) of a South Asian Community Council of the Heart and Stroke Foundation of Ontario, and has studied and educated the Canadian Community on the risks of cardiovascular disease amongst the South Asians.

Personal life 
Devanesen was appointed Member of the Order of Canada on 30 May 2001, and invested with the honour on 4 December 2001. His citation into the Order called him "a positive role model and mentor to hundreds of medical residents, family physicians and nurse practitioners."

Devanesen practices family medicine in Mississauga since 1999. He practiced alongside his wife, Dr Asha Devanesen, Emeritus from the College of Physician and Surgeons of Ontario.

References 

1943 births
Living people
20th-century Indian medical doctors
Indian surgeons
Canadian general practitioners
University of Madras alumni
University of Western Ontario alumni
University of Toronto alumni
Academic staff of the University of Toronto
Members of the Order of Canada
Indian emigrants to Canada
Activists from Toronto
Canadian people of Indian descent
Bishop Cotton Boys' School alumni
Canadian health activists
20th-century surgeons